The National Women's Council of Uruguay (Consejo Nacional de Mujeres del Uruguay, CONAMU) was a women's organization in Uruguay, founded in 1916.  

It was founded by the leading suffragist Paulina Luisi in 1916 along with other feminists such as Francisca Beretervide and Isabel Pinto de Vidal. It played an important role in the struggle for women's suffrage, which was finally introduced in Uruguay in 1932, but this was not the only issue promoted by the organisation.

References 

1916 establishments in Uruguay
Feminism and history
Feminist organizations in South America
Organizations established in 1916
Social history of Uruguay
Voter rights and suffrage organizations
Women's organizations based in Uruguay
Women's suffrage in Uruguay
Feminism in Uruguay